Andreea Adespii (née Molnar; born 9 May 1990) is a Romanian female handball player who plays for SCM Craiova.

Achievements  
Liga Națională:
Winner: 2019
Bronze Medalist: 2014
Cupa României:
Finalist: 2018, 2019 
Supercupa României:
Winner: 2018

References
  

1990 births
Living people
Sportspeople from Brașov
Romanian female handball players 
SCM Râmnicu Vâlcea (handball) players